Merig is a small island located  east of Gaua, in the Banks Islands of northern Vanuatu.

Name
The name Merig  comes from the Mota language. It comes from a Proto-Torres-Banks form *mʷera riɣi "the small boy" via haplology to *mʷeriɣi. It contrasts with Merelava, from *mʷera lava "the big boy". The native term in Mwerlap is N̄wërig , from the same etymon.

History
It was then named Île Sainte Claire.

Population
Merig is only inhabited by one household, consisting of 12 individuals.

They speak Mwerlap, the language of the neighbouring island Merelava.

References

External links

Islands of Vanuatu
Volcanoes of Vanuatu
Torba Province
Pleistocene stratovolcanoes